Evolutionary anachronism is a concept in evolutionary biology named by Connie C. Barlow in her book, The Ghosts of Evolution (2000). It refers to attributes of living species that are best explained as a result of having been favorably selected in the past due to coevolution with other biological species that have since become extinct. When this context is removed, the natural attributes appear as unexplained energy investments by the living organism, with no apparent benefit, and perhaps are prejudicial to the continued reproduction of the surviving species.

The general theory was formulated by Costa Rican-based American botanist Daniel Janzen and University of Arizona-based geologist Paul S. Martin (a prominent defender of the overkill hypothesis to explain the Quaternary extinction event) in a Science article published in 1982, titled Neotropical Anachronisms: The fruit the gomphotheres ate. Previously, in 1977, Stanley Temple had proposed a similar idea to explain the decline of the Mauritius endemic tree tambalacoque following the extinction of the iconic dodo.

Janzen, Martin and Barlow mainly discussed evolutionary anachronisms in the context of seed dispersal and passive defense strategies exhibited by plants that had evolved alongside disappeared megaherbivores, although some examples apply to animal species as relict behavior.

Evolutionary anachronisms are not the same as vestigiality. Though both concepts refer ultimately to organs that evolved in response to environmental pressures not currently present, in the case of anachronisms, the original function of the organ and the capacity of the organism to use it are retained. For example, the present-day absence of avocado-eating gomphotheres does not render avocado pulp vestigial, rudimentary or incapable of its original function in seed nutrition and dispersal (zoochory) if a new suitable ecological partner were to appear.

Megafauna dispersal syndrome
Dispersal syndromes are complexes of fruit traits that enable plants to disperse seeds. The kind of fruits that birds are attracted to are usually small, with only a thin protective skin, and the colors are red or dark shades of blue or purple. Fruits categorized as mammal syndrome are bigger than bird fruits. They possess a tough rind or husk, emit a strong odor when ripe but retain a dull coloration of brown, burnished yellow, orange or remain green, because most mammals have a powerful sense of smell but poor color vision in general, primates being the most notable exception. The megafauna dispersal syndrome refers to those attributes of fruits that evolved in order to attract megafauna (animals that weigh or weighed more than 44 kilograms) as primary dispersal agents. Since the Holocene extinction, large herbivores have become extinct outside Africa and to a lesser extent Asia, leaving these fruits without a suitable dispersal mechanism in the absence of agriculture.

Common megafaunal dispersal traits

Large fruit, best suited to be consumed whole by large animals without seed loss.
Fruit grows on or close to the trunk, or on stout branches.
Indehiscent fruit that retains its seeds upon ripening.
Seeds deter or elude being ground up by teeth through having a thick, tough or hard endocarp; or bitter, peppering or nauseating toxins. They are also difficult to separate from the pulp, which is tasty and soft, to deter seed spitting.
The seeds benefit from—or even require—physical or chemical abrasion to germinate.
If tropical, the fruit drops on or just before ripening, stopping monkeys from eating them. In colder climates, the fruit stays on the branch for a prolonged time, keeping it away from predation by ineffectual seed dispersers like rodents.
"Looks, feels, smells, and tastes" like other fruits known to be dispersed by megafauna where megafauna still exists.

Ecological indicators of missing dispersal partners

The fruit either rots where it falls or is ineffectually disseminated by current dispersal agents.
The plant is more common where livestock (proxy for megafauna) are present.
The seeds germinate and grow well in upland habitats where planted, but the species almost exclusively inhabits floodplains (where water flow disperses the seeds) in the wild.
The geographic range is inexplicably patchy or restricted.

Proposed examples in plants

Afrotropical realm

Madagascar

Australasian realm

New Zealand

Indomalayan realm

{| class=wikitable
|-
! Example
! Binomial name
! Native range
! Anachronism description
! Suggested extinct coevolutionary partners
|-
| Ginkgo || Ginkgo biloba || Southern China || An extreme living fossil, its genus existed already in the Jurassic and the species might go back to the Middle Cretaceous. Ginkgos were widespread through the Northern Hemisphere until the Paleocene, survived in North America until the end of the Miocene, and in Europe and Japan until the Pleistocene. Seeds are protected by a shell too fragile to deter mammals, since they are capable of mastication, but the pulp is poisonous to frugivores (including humans). Red-bellied tree squirrels (in China) and eastern gray squirrels (in North American parks and plantations) are known to extract seeds from the pulp and store them, but are only secondary dispersers. Fallen diaspores smell like rotten flesh after a few days on the ground, attracting carnivorans like the masked palm civet, leopard cat, and raccoon dog, which eat them whole; however, their marking of their territory through defecation also limits their ability as seed dispersers. Pollination is exclusively by the wind, but the chemical profile of pollination drops is similar to those of insect-pollinated, or mixed wind and insect-pollinated Gnetophyta. || Squirrel-like multituberculates, particularly Ptilodus.Small carrion-eating dinosaurs both lived on the ground and lacked the powerful masticatory apparatus and gizzard stones of vegetarian species.Several extinct, early pollinating insect lineages are known from the Middle Jurassic to the Early Cretaceous, before modern flowers evolved. Most are long-proboscid scorpion flies (Mecoptera), including Juracimbrophlebia, whose shape mimicked ginkgo leaves.The unusual trunk and root growth pattern may have evolved in a pre-angiosperm world where the main competitors of the ginkgo were tree ferns, cycads and cycadeoids.
|-
| Plum-Yew || Cephalotaxus spp. || East Asia || Gymnosperm widespread through the Northern Hemisphere in the Tertiary. || Multituberculates.
|-
| Rafflesia || Rafflesia spp. || Southeast Asia || Between 14 and 28 species of dioecious parasitic plants with no visible stems, branches or leaves, but that produce enormous red flowers with a fetid, carrion-like smell. The smell attracts flies but they are poor pollinators. The fruits are giant berries around 14 centimeters long, with woody, cryptic cover; and smooth, oily flesh which smells and tastes like overripe coconut. The only observed dispersers are small rodents and treeshrews that eat part of the pulp and sometimes swallow seeds. Most species are endangered and have disjunct and extremely limited ranges. || The original main pollinators might have been dung or carrion-eating beetles that became rarer as the megafauna declined.The Asian elephant, Javan rhinoceros and Sumatran rhinoceros all used to, but are no longer present in Rafflesia'''s range, and might have been its intended seed dispersers.
|}

Nearctic realm

Neotropical realm

{| class=wikitable
|-
! Example
! Binomial name
! Native range
! Anachronism description
! Suggested extinct coevolutionary partners
|-
| || Acacia riparia || Caribbean, Central and South America || Recurved thorns on twigs and leaves. || Ground sloths and gomphotheres.
|-
| Cuban belly palm || Acrocomia crispa || Cuba || Large-seeded fruit that takes at least two years to germinate when left on the ground, but only four weeks after being swallowed and dispersed by a captive Galapagos tortoise. || Extinct giant tortoises.
|-
| Almendro || Dipteryx oleifera || Honduras to Colombia ||  || Gomphotheres.
|-
| American figs || Ficus spp. || Neotropics || Excessive fruit yield, more than bats and spider monkeys can take. ||
|-
|  Angel's trumpets || Brugmansia spp. || Tropical Andes and southeastern Brazil || Long extinct in the wild, the fruit shrivels on the plant without progeny, and they are only maintained in cultivation by humans as a source of psychotropic drugs. || Mammalian megafauna.
|-
| Ara a gato || Senegalia tenuifolia || California to Bolivia and Brazil, including the Caribbean || Recurved thorns on twigs and leaves. || Ground sloths and gomphotheres.
|-
| Avocado || Persea americana || Mesoamerica || Although the pulp is nutritive and eaten by many animals (even carnivores), the seeds are too large to be swallowed. Zoochory is limited to seeds hoarded by agoutis or eaten by jaguars, but they only do occasionally. Relatives in different latitudes have smaller fruit and seeds, and are eaten by vegetarians. The pulp is soft as to not need chewing, but the seeds are poisonous. Forest elephants feed on plantations in Cameroon. || Reaching up to six meters tall, the adults of the giant ground sloth Eremotherium could have gained access to ripe avocados before any other mammal (and juveniles, small enough to climb trees, might have reached higher). The soft, fatty pulp might have made avocados attractive to ground sloths over other fruits, due to their lack of incisors and canines.Cuvieronius, Toxodon, glyptodonts, brontotheres.
|-
| Baboonwood || Virola surinamensis || Costa Rica to Brazil and Peru || Fruit typical of those dispersed by birds and monkeys (bright red, dehiscent, with seeds individually coated with fleshy aril), but slightly larger. Its known assemblage of bird and mammal dispersal agents is anomalously small and the fruit is often found rotting on the ground. The plant sprouts better from larger seeds, yet the seeds better dispersed are the smaller ones ingested by birds. || Protopithecus, a distant relative of howler and spider monkeys but twice the size of the largest living New World monkey.
|-
| Black calabash || Amphitecna macrophylla || Small patches of Mexico and Guatemala ||  || Gomphotheres.
|-
| Black palm || Astrocaryum standleyanum || Nicaragua to Ecuador ||  || Gomphotheres.
|-
| Black sapote || Diospyros nigra || Eastern Mexico, the Caribbean, Central America, and Colombia ||  ||
|-
| Boat-spine acacia || Acacia cochliacantha || Mexico || Extremely thorny at shrub level, almost entirely unarmed at tree level. || 
|-
| || Bunchosia biocellata || Southeastern Mexico to Nicaragua ||  ||
|-
| Cabbage tree || Andira inermis || Southern Mexico to Northern South America || Fruit eaten by bats but often found felled under the tree; passed over by domestic pigs, horses, and cattle, possibly due to high antibiotic content in the pulp. The seeds of uneaten fruit are killed by weevil larvae. || Gomphotheres and Toxodon.
|-
| Calabash tree || Crescentia cujete || Central and South America || Fruit the size of a soccer ball, with a hard rind tough to crack. The largest living native mammal, Baird's tapir, cannot open its mouth wide enough to bite it. The only animals witnessed feeding on the fruit are domestic horses, which step on top of it and employ as much as two hundred kilograms pressure to open it. The seeds are rubbery and surrounded by slimy black tissue that is both fetid and sweet. The fruit falls to the ground while still green, and ripens after a month on the forest floor. || American horses.Toxodon was a rhinoceros-sized notoungulate with large, unusually oriented incisors whose function is poorly understood. They could have evolved to peel fruits of this type.
|-
| Carao || Cassia grandis || Southern Mexico to Venezuela and Ecuador || Hard, cylindrical, half-meter long fruit with an inch and a half diameter, containing large seeds 2 centimeters long, 1.5 cm wide and 0.5 cm thick, embedded in sweet molasses-like pulp. The fruit often remains on the tree long enough for bean weevils and moths to kill the seeds, making it an obvious maladaptation. || Ground sloths and Cuvieronius.
|-
| Cedron || Simaba cedron || Colombia and Central America ||  || Gomphotheres.
|-
| Ceiba tree || Ceiba aesculifoliaC. pentandraC. speciosa || Tropics, mostly in America but also Africa and southeast Asia || Prominent trunk spines (only saplings in C. pentandra's case). || Browsing megafauna.
|-
| Central American burs || Aeschynomene spp.Bidens ripariaDesmodium spp.Krameria cuspidataPetiveria alliaceaPisonia macrunthocarpaTriumfetta lappula || Central America || Burs stick to the dense hair of horses and cattle, but not to native wild mammals like tapirs, pacas, collared peccaries or white-lipped peccaries. Excluding Pisonia and Krameria, all are herbaceous species that occur on open, well-trampled habitats. || Gomphotheres, Toxodon, and ground sloths.
|-
| CherimoyaCustard apple and relatives || Annona cherimolaA. reticulataA. muricataA. squamosaA. purpureaA. holosericeaA. reticulataSapranthus palanga || Neotropics ||  || Cuvieronius.
|-
| Chilean mesquite || Prosopis chilensis || Peru, eastern Argentina and central Chile || Sweet fruit with hard seeds. Grows mostly in floodplains and stream margins, in natural corridors followed by livestock herds. ||
|-
| Christ's Crown of Thorns || Gleditsia amorphoides || Argentina || Defensive trunk spines up to forty centimeters long. || American horses and proboscideans.
|-
| Cocoa trees || Theobroma spp. || Central and South America ||  || Gomphotheres.
|-
| Divi-divi || Caesalpina coriacea || Caribbean, Mexico, Central and Northern South America ||  ||
|-
| Dyer's mulberry || Maclura tinctoria || Mexico to Argentina || Saplings with trunk spines. || Browsing megafauna.
|-
| Genipapo || Genipa americana || Southern Mexico to Peru ||  ||
|-
| Grangel || Randia echinocarpa || Mexico || Sweet fruit with hard seeds. Grows mostly in floodplains and stream margins, in natural corridors followed by livestock herds. ||
|-
| Grugru || Acrocomia aculeata || Southern Mexico and the Caribbean to Paraguay and northern Argentina || Large fruit and seeds, with tough epicarp, sticky pulp, and hard endocarp. The fruit grows at heights suitable for terrestrial mammals, but it is often found felled under the tree, uneaten, and accompanied by older, ungerminated seeds. Young trees are heliophilous, requiring the clearing of older trees to grow. Cattle ingest the fruit, dispersing the seeds when they regurgitate them during rumination, and help the establishment of new plants through trampling of older vegetation. Long trunk and leaf spines ill-suited to dissuade smaller predators like rodents. || Browsing megafauna.
|-
| Guanacaste tree || Enterolobium cyclocarpum || Central Mexico to northern Brazil and Venezuela || The flowers grow rapidly into large, fleshy, ear-shaped pods during the dry season of the year after fertilization. The ripe pods are brown and cacao-flavored, and fall to the ground over the space of a month. Though many wild animals eat the pods' flesh, only tapirs are large enough to swallow and disperse the seeds. The pods are eaten and dispersed with ease by domestic horses and cattle, making trees common in pastures or near them. || American horses, gomphotheres, glyptodonts, ground sloths, Columbian mammoths, and toxodonts.
|-
| Guapinol || Hymenaea courbaril || Caribbean, Central and South America || Thick woody pod with  dry sugary pulp and dark color. Though with obvious signs of megafaunal dispersal syndrome, the seeds are dispersed almost exclusively by a seed-hoarding rodent, the agouti. || Gomphotheres.
|-
| Guatemalan zizfum || Ziziphus guatemalensis || Chiapas to Costa Rica ||  ||
|-
| Guayabillo || Chloroleucon mangense || Central, Northern South America and the Caribbean || Sweet fruit with hard seeds. Grows mostly in floodplains and stream margins, in natural corridors followed by livestock herds. ||
|- 
| Ixtle || Aechmea magdalenae || Southern Mexico to Ecuador ||  || Gomphotheres
|-
|  || Jacquinia pungens || Southern Mexico to Costa Rica || Leaves grow needle-sharp tips only during the dry season. Spines best developed within four to six meters of the ground. || Ground sloths and gomphotheres.
|-
| Locust bean || Parkia pendula || Honduras to Bolivia and Brazil ||  || Gomphotheres.
|-
|  Manchineel || Hippomane mancinella || Southern North America and Northern South America || Small seeds imbedded in a hard core. ||
|-
|  Maya nut || Brosimum alicastrum || Yucatan and Guatemala to the Amazon ||  ||
|-
| Mexican calabash || Crescentia alata || Mesoamerica and Central America || White, orange-sized fruit. Unless mechanically broken, the seeds die either from desiccation (in a dry environment) or when the pulp ferments (in moist). The fruit is often consumed by free-ranging horses, and the tree's size (3–4 meters tall) and shape is similar to African trees dispersed by megafauna. || Fossils of the native horse Amerhippus have been found in the plant's range area.
|-
| Mimosa || Mimosa eurycarpaM. guanacastensis || Central and South America || Recurved thorns in twigs and leaves. || Ground sloths and gomphotheres.
|-
| Monkeypod || Pithecellobium dulce || Pacific coast of Mexico, Central and northern South America || Sweet fruit with hard seeds. Grows mostly in floodplains and stream margins, in natural corridors followed by livestock herds. ||
|-
| Nance || Byrsonima crassifolia || Central Mexico to Bolivia and Brazil, including the Caribbean ||  || 
|-
| Nicaragua persimmon || Diospyros nicaraguensis || Eastern Yucatan, southern Nicaragua and northern Costa Rica || Large fruit production that rots on the ground. || 
|-
| Forest palm || Attalea rostrata || Central America || Large fruit and seeds, with tough epicarp, sticky pulp and hard endocarp. The fruit grows at heights suitable for terrestrial mammals, but it is often found felled under the tree, uneaten, and accompanied by older, ungerminated seeds. Young trees are heliophilous, requiring the clearing of older trees to grow. Cattle ingest the fruit, dispersing the seeds when they regurgitate them during rumination, and also help the establishment of new plants through trampling of older vegetation. || Cuvieronius.
|-
| Jobo || Spondias mombinS. purpureaS. radlkoferi || Neotropics || Excessive fruit crop with small seeds imbedded in a hard core. ||
|-
| Ojo de Buey || Dioclea megacarpa || Western Nicaragua ||  ||
|-
| Papaya || Carica papaya || Central and northern South America || The wild form measures about ten centimeters. The pulp is soft and does not require chewing, but the seeds are poisonous. Seeds small but clustered at the center, with a pungent, peppery taste. Forest elephants feed on plantations in Cameroon. || Cuvieronius, ground sloths, and Toxodon.
|-
| Peine de mico || Apeiba tibourbou || Caatinga, Cerrado and Costa Rica ||  ||
|-
| Piñuela || Bromelia karatasB. pinguin || Sinaloa to Brazil ||  ||
|-
| Pochote || Pachira quinata || Costa Rica to Colombia and Venezuela || Prominent trunk spines, especially in younger trees. || Browsing megafauna.
|-
| Pouteria tree || Pouteria spp. || Neotropics ||  || Gomphotheres. 
|-
| Pupunha || Bactris guineensisB. major || Mexico to Colombia, Venezuela and Trinidad || Large fruit and seeds, with tough epicarp, sticky pulp and hard endocarp. The fruit grows at heights suitable for terrestrial mammals, but it is often found felled under the tree, uneaten, and accompanied by older, ungerminated seeds. Young trees are heliophilous, requiring the clearing of older trees to grow. Cattle ingest the fruit, dispersing the seeds when they regurgitate them during rumination, and also help the establishment of new plants through trampling of older vegetation. Long leaf spines ill-suited to dissuade smaller predators like rodents. ||
|-
| Purui || Alibertia edulis || Caribbean coast of Central America ||  ||
|-
| Rain tree || Albizia saman || Mexico to Peru and Brazil || Fruit eaten by domestic horses and cattle. ||
|-
| Sachamango || Gustavia superba || Central and Northwestern South America ||  || 
|-
| Sali || Tetragastris panamensis || Guatemala to Bolivia and Brazil || Fruit very similar to Baboonwood. Seed waste deemed "enormous" and known dispersal agents "inefficient". || Protopithecus. 
|-
| Sandbox tree || Hura crepitans || Tropical North and South America || Prominent trunk spines, especially in young trees. || Browsing megafauna.
|-
| Sapodilla || Manilkara zapota || Mexico, Central America and the Caribbean ||  ||
|-
| Shinglewood || Nectandra hihua || Mexico and Florida to Brazil || Sweet fruit with hard seeds. Grows mostly in floodplains and stream margins, in natural corridors followed by livestock herds. ||
|-
| || Sphinga platyloba || Central America || Recurved thorns on twigs and leaves. || Ground sloths and gomphotheres.
|-
| Sweet acacia || Vachellia farnesiana || Mexico and Central America || Fruit sought by domestic cattle and horses. ||
|-
| Tempisque || Sideroxylon capiri || Mesoamerica and the West Indies ||  ||
|-
| Velvetseed || Guettarda macrosperma || Chiapas to Costa Rica ||  ||
|-
| West Indian elm || Guazuma ulmifolia || Neotropics || Sweet fruit with hard seeds eaten by domestic horses and cattle. Grows mostly in floodplains and stream margins, in natural corridors followed by livestock herds. The pulp has woody obstacles that prevent mastication. ||
|-
| White bayahonda || Prosopis juliflora || Mexico, South America and the Caribbean || Very localized and patchy distribution along margins of mangrove swamps and beaches. Ingested by cattle and horses. ||
|-
|  || Zamia spp. || Mexico to Bolivia, including the West Indies ||  || Gomphotheres.
|-
| || Zanthoxylum setulosum || Costa Rica to Colombia and Venezuela || Prominent trunk spines, especially in young trees. || Browsing megafauna.
|}

Oceanian realm

Palearctic realm

Proposed examples in animals

In popular culture

The phenomenon was referenced (though not by name) in the 1259 issue "Bee Orchid" of the online comic strip xkcd by Randall Munroe, published on September 2, 2013. In the comic, it is claimed that the orchid Ophrys apifera mimics the female of a bee species to attract males and ensure pollination, but that the bee is extinct and the orchid is doomed to follow, only delaying it by resorting to less effective self-pollination. In reality, only the first part is true: the flower mimics a bee, and reproduces exclusively by self-pollination in northern Europe, but it is pollinated successfully by bees of the genus Eucera'' in the Mediterranean region.

See also
Coevolution
Coextinction
Evolutionary arms race
Evolutionary mismatch
Evolutionary trap
Holocene extinction
Keystone species
Pleistocene extinction
Pleistocene rewilding

References

External links
Youtube video "Why are Lemurs Terrified of Predators that don't Exist?"
Gourds and squashes (Cucurbita spp.) adapted to megafaunal extinction and ecological anachronism through domestication

Evolutionary biology
 
 
Ecology
Habitat